Kindal Jerome Moorehead (born October 14, 1978) is an American football coach and former defensive tackle. He was drafted by the Carolina Panthers in the fifth round of the 2003 NFL Draft. He was a first-team All SEC college football at Alabama.

He played high school football for Melrose High School in Memphis, Tennessee where he earned USA All-American, Parade All-American, Mr. Football and a state championship in 1997. He was teammates with Cedrick Wilson Sr. who also made it to the NFL and earned a Super Bowl ring with the Pittsburgh Steelers in 2005.

Moorehead played for the Panthers from 2003 to 2007. During the 2004 season, he served as a replacement for the injured Kris Jenkins at defensive tackle, despite playing with a sore shoulder. He joined the Atlanta Falcons during the 2008 season.

In 2010, Moorehead joined Nick Saban's staff at Alabama as an assistant strength and conditioning coach. In July 2020, he was hired at Tennessee in the same capacity.

References

External links
Official website

1978 births
Living people
People from Memphis, Tennessee
American football defensive ends
American football defensive tackles
Alabama Crimson Tide football players
Carolina Panthers players
Atlanta Falcons players